Iceland was historically divided into 23 counties known as sýslur, and 23 independent towns known as kaupstaðir. Iceland is now split up between 24 sýslumenn (magistrates) that are the highest authority over the local police (except in Reykjavík where there is a special office of police commissioner) and carry out administrative functions such as declaring bankruptcy and marrying people outside of the church. The jurisdictions of these magistrates often follow the lines of the historical counties, but not always. When speaking of these new "administrative" counties, the custom is to associate them with the county seats rather than using the names of the traditional counties, even when they cover the same area.

Composition
Independent towns (kaupstaðir) were first created in the 18th century as urbanisation began in Iceland; this practice continued into the 1980s. The last town that was declared an independent town was Ólafsvík in 1983. Since then, the laws regarding municipalities have been changed in such a way that there is no longer any distinction made between urban or rural municipalities.

Historical counties
The historical counties were:

Árnessýsla 
Austur-Barðastrandarsýsla 
Austur-Húnavatnssýsla 
Austur-Skaftafellssýsla 
Borgarfjarðarsýsla 
Dalasýsla 
Eyjafjarðarsýsla 
Gullbringusýsla 
Kjósarsýsla 
Mýrasýsla 
Norður-Ísafjarðarsýsla 
Norður-Múlasýsla 
Norður-Þingeyjarsýsla 
Rangárvallasýsla 
Skagafjarðarsýsla 
Snæfellsnes- og Hnappadalssýsla 
Strandasýsla 
Suður-Múlasýsla 
Suður-Þingeyjarsýsla 
Vestur-Barðastrandarsýsla 
Vestur-Húnavatnssýsla 
Vestur-Ísafjarðarsýsla 
Vestur-Skaftafellssýsla

Independent towns
The 23 independent towns were:

Akranes
Akureyri (with Grímsey)
Bolungarvík
Dalvík
Eskifjörður
Garðabær
Grindavík
Grundarfjörður (in the past)
Hafnarfjörður
Húsavík
Ísafjörður
Keflavík
Kópavogur
Neskaupstaður
Njarðvík
Ólafsfjörður
Ólafsvík
Reykjavík
Sauðárkrókur
Selfoss
Seltjarnarnes
Seyðisfjörður
Siglufjörður
Vestmannaeyjar

See also
Farthings of Iceland
Regions of Iceland
Municipalities of Iceland
Constituencies of Iceland

 
Subdivisions of Iceland
Iceland, Counties
Iceland 1
Counties, Iceland
Iceland geography-related lists